Rancho San Vicente may refer to one of four pre-statehood land grants in California, United States:

 Rancho San Vicente, Santa Clara County
 Rancho San Vicente (Escamilla), Santa Cruz County
 Rancho San Vicente (Munrás), Monterey County, California
 Rancho San Vicente y Santa Monica, Los Angeles County